Clathromangelia loiselieri is a species of sea snail, a marine gastropod mollusk in the family Raphitomidae.

Description
The shell grows to a length of 5 mm. This species lacks a radula.

Distribution
This species occurs in the Eastern Mediterranean Sea off Greece.

References

 Oberling J.J. (1970). Quelques espèces nouvelles de Gastropodes du bassin Méditerranéen. Kleine Mitteilungen, Naturhistorisches Museum Bern 1: 1–7
 van Aartsen J. J. & Zenetou A., 1987: Il genere Clathromangelia Monterosato, 1884 nel Mediterraneo con la descrizione di Clathromangelia fehri n. sp; La Conchiglia 19 (222–223): 10–11
 Oliverio M. (1995). The systematics of the radula-less gastropod Clathromangelia (Caenogastropoda, Conoidea). Zoologica Scripta 24(3): 193–201
 Gofas, S.; Le Renard, J.; Bouchet, P. (2001). Mollusca, in: Costello, M.J. et al. (Ed.) (2001). European register of marine species: a check-list of the marine species in Europe and a bibliography of guides to their identification. Collection Patrimoines Naturels, 50: pp. 180–213

External links
 
  Bouchet P., Kantor Yu.I., Sysoev A. & Puillandre N. (2011) A new operational classification of the Conoidea. Journal of Molluscan Studies 77: 273–308

loiselieri